Rahmatabad (also Romanized as Raḩmatābād) is a village in Kuhsar Rural District, in the Central District of Khansar County, Isfahan Province, Iran. At the 2006 census, its population was 817, in 304 families.

References 

Populated places in Khansar County